Lakeridge Health Port Perry is a hospital located in Port Perry, Ontario, Canada. The hospital serves the townships of Scugog, Brock and Uxbridge in Durham Region.

History
The hospital was founded as the private in 1946 at a home at 96 John Street as the Port Perry Hospital, but closed to cost of upgrading the old building in 1948. In 1949 residences used for munitions workers were moved from Ajax, Ontario and moved to Port Perry. During the interim Oshawa Hospital served the community from 1949 to 1953. The new Community Memorial opened in 1953 as a 32-bed facility. It moved again in 1969 to its current location on Paxton Street.

In April 1997, under the Common Sense Revolution, the hospital was amalgamated with Uxbridge Cottage Hospital to form North Durham Health Services (NDHS). Uxbridge became linked with Markham-Stouffvile Hospital in 2004.

In 1998 the hospital, along with Memorial Hospital Bowmanville, Oshawa General Hospital and Whitby General Hospital, were placed under the administration of the Lakeridge Health Corporation. The hospital was renamed, and Uxbridge Cottage was placed under the jurisdiction of the Markham-Stouffville Hospital Corporation.

On August 25, 2017 a fire occurred at the hospital, damaging some key systems, resulting in the temporary closure of the hospital. The hospital reopened on September 5, 2018.

Facilities
The main building (with ambulatory entrance) is named Stephen Roman Wing.

The hospital has a helipad located on the southside of the hospital facing Paxton Street and located west of the south parking lot. The helipad allows patients to be transferred to other hospitals for more advance care not available at the Port Perry site or patients arriving to Port Perry other than regular ambulances.

Services
The current hospital has 180 staff members and 20 physicians, with a 24/7 emergency room, acute care, continuing care, and surgery.

 Medicine 
 Emergency
 Surgical Services and Outpatient Clinics
 Ambulatory Rehabilitation Centre
 New Life Centre (Maternal/Child Program)
 Respiratory Therapy
 Pharmacy
 Laboratory
 Diagnostic Imaging
 Ultrasound
 Infection Prevention and Control
 Diabetes Education
 Social Work
 Palliative Care
 Mental Health
 Spiritual Services
 Volunteer Services

See also
 Lakeridge Health Oshawa
 Lakeridge Health Whitby
 Lakeridge Health Bowmanville

References

External links
 Lakeridge Health Corporation

Hospitals in the Regional Municipality of Durham
Hospital buildings completed in 1969
Heliports in Ontario
Certified airports in Ontario